Zhilino is a rural locality (a village) in Pogorelovskoye Rural Settlement, Totemsky District, Vologda Oblast, Russia. The population was 21 as of 2002.

Geography 
Zhilino is located 58 km southwest of Totma (the district's administrative centre) by road. Bykovo is the nearest rural locality.

References 

Rural localities in Totemsky District